The Twenty-third Dynasty of Egypt (notated Dynasty XXIII, alternatively 23rd Dynasty or Dynasty 23) is usually classified as the third dynasty of the ancient Egyptian Third Intermediate Period. This dynasty consisted of a number of Meshwesh  kings, who ruled either as pharaohs or as independent kings of parts of Upper Egypt from 880 BC to 720 BC, and pharaohs from 837 BC to 728 BC.

History 
There is much debate surrounding this dynasty, which may have been situated at Herakleopolis Magna, Hermopolis Magna, and Thebes. Monuments from their reign show that they controlled Upper Egypt in parallel with the Twenty-second dynasty, shortly before the death of Osorkon II.

While the Twenty-third Dynasty is considered a Tanite dynasty, as it originated from the city Tanis, it never reigned from there. The Twenty-second Dynasty, from Bubastis, took over Tanis and Memphis and managed to retain these cities almost until the end of their Dynasty. As a result, the Twenty-third Dynasty, being more or less an offshoot of the Twenty-second Dynasty, originated from Tanis. Instead, as mentioned above, most historians argue that they used Leontopolis as their capital. This is confirmed by Piankhy's stela, which locates Iuput II in Leontopolis. However, some historians argue that Iuput II should not be considered a Twenty-third Dynasty king at all, as it has not been undoubtedly proven that the Twenty-third Dynasty ruled from Leontopolis, merely that Iuput II ruled from somewhere in the Delta. If Iuput II is the only connection between the Twenty-third Dynasty and Leontopolis, this viewpoint would eliminate Piankhy's stela as proof for Leontopolis being the capital of the Twenty-third Dynasty.

Another reason there is much debate is besides the conflicts between Lower and Upper Egypt that existed, there were now also conflicts in the Delta itself. Part of these conflicts were succession struggles, but another part involved the High Priests of Amun at Thebes, who for a period during the Twenty-first Dynasty effectively ruled Upper Egypt, despite not being regarded as a separate dynasty (however, some did become pharaoh as part of a dynasty, like Psusennes I). Although their power declined after the Twenty-first Dynasty, the High Priests of Amun remained powerful and influential, and marriages into the royal family were not unusual. As a result, multiple reigns within the Twenty-third Dynasty as well as between the Twenty-second and Twenty-third Dynasties overlap. This is because some members of the Twenty-third Dynasty reigned as independent kings (like Harsiese A), and as a separate dynasty after Osorkon II’s (of the Twenty-second Dynasty) death. Some historians argue that the Twenty-third Dynasty started with Takelot II, and consider Pedubastis I as a separate independent (and short lived) part of that Dynasty. Others consider Takelot II's line as a separate independent part of the Twenty-second Dynasty, and consider Pedubastis I's short lived line as the Twenty-third Dynasty.

When Osorkon II died, crown prince Shoshenq had already died, so his younger brother Takelot II took the throne at Tanis. High priest of Amun at that moment in time was Nimlot, Takelot II's half-brother. Nimlot was appointed by Osorkon II, and Nimlot married his own daughter, Karomama Merytmut II, to Takelot II. As a result, Nimlot would be the grandfather of any children, and thus heirs to the throne, Takelot II would get. When Nimlot died in the eleventh year of Takelot II, a fight for the succession broke out. Takelot II chose prince Osorkon, but Harsiese, grandson of the chief priest, did not agree. Thebes revolted at his hand, but prince Osorkon managed to crush the revolt.

This relative peace lasted four years, as in Takelot II's fifteenth year a civil war broke out. This conflict lasted for almost ten years, and after another two years of relative peace, the Thebans once again revolted. Takelot II died before this new conflict was resolved, and with prince Osorkon far from Tanis, his younger brother Shoshenq III seized power. While this helped in resolving the conflict with Thebes, because they accepted Shoshenq III as king, a new conflict started. Instead of a conflict between royal families, this was from within the royal family. Prince Pedubastis proclaimed himself king, and reigned from Leontopolis, simultaneously with Shoshenq III.

While prince Osorkon was usurped by his brother Shoshenq III, Shoshenq did reappoint him as chief priest of Amun. Because Harsiese, of the Theban revolt above, disappeared in the twenty-ninth year of Shoshenq III's reign, prince Osorkon effectively controlled Upper Egypt for about a decade as chief priest of Amun. Meanwhile, Shoshenq III was and remained more powerful than the kings in Leontopolis. By this time, Pedubastis and his son Iuput, whom he had appointed as co-regent, had already died, seemingly in the same year (804 BC). Shoshenq VI had succeeded Pedubastis, but not for long, as prince Osorkon succeeded him six years later as Osorkon III, reigning simultaneously with Shoshenq III for the last years of his reign.

At Herakleopolis a Twenty-second Dynasty king named Shoshenq V was still in power around 766 BC. However, Osorkon III installed his eldest son Takelot there, also allowing him to be chief priest of Amun at the same time. As a result, the Twenty-second Dynasty's role in the Theban area was greatly reduced. When Osorkon III died, Takelot had had been his father's co-regent and was thus now sole ruler.

Takelot III had given up his role as chief priest when he became pharaoh, and his sister, Shepenwepet I, seems to have taken over that role as well as being appointed as Divine Adoratrice of Amun. As a result, she effectively ruled over the Theban region with her brother. Takelot III also gave up his rule of Herakleopolis to Peftjauawhybastet, who was married to a daughter of Rudamon, Takelot's brother. Rudamon succeeded Takelot III, but shortly after was succeeded by Iuput II (also known as Ini/Iny). Under his reign the region became more divided again, as Peftjauawybastet and Nimlot, governor of Hermopolis, adopted royal titles. Rudamon and Iuput II only reigned over Thebes in the final phase of the Twenty-third Dynasty, as Piankhy, king of Napata, put an end to the so-called ‘Libyan anarchy’.

Pharaohs and Kings of the 23rd Dynasty

Further reading
 J.P. Elias, "A Northern Member of the 'Theban' Twenty-Third Dynasty", Discussions in Egyptology 31 (1995), 57-67.
 J. Goldberg, "The 23rd Dynasty Problem Revisited: Where, When and Who?", Discussions in Egyptology 29 (1994), 55-85.
 H. Jacquet Gordon, "Deux graffiti d'époque libyenne sur le toit du Temple de Khonsu à Karnak" in Hommages à la memoire de Serge Sauneron, 1927-1976 (Cairo: 1979), pp. 169–74.
 K.A. Kitchen, The Third Intermediate Period in Egypt (c.1100–650 BC), 3rd ed., Warminster: 1996.
Naunton, Christopher. “Libyans and Nubians.” A Companion to Ancient Egypt, by Alan B. Lloyd, vol. 1, Wiley-Blackwell, 2010, pp. 120–139.

References

 
States and territories established in the 9th century BC
States and territories disestablished in the 8th century BC
23
9th century BC
8th-century BC disestablishments in Egypt
8th century BC in Egypt
9th-century BC establishments in Egypt
9th century BC in Egypt
Berbers in Egypt
23